This is a list of awards and nominations for composer Alan Menken. Menken has been recognized with multiple awards and nominations for his work in film, theatre, television, and music.

For his work in film he earned 19 Academy Award nominations winning 8 Oscars for The Little Mermaid (1989), Beauty and the Beast (1991), Aladdin (1992), and Pocahontas (1995). He also earned 16 Golden Globe Award nominations winning 7 awards. He has earned two British Academy Film Award nominations, and five Critics' Choice Movie Award nominations. For his work in theatre he received five Tony Award nominations winning once, and 2 Laurence Olivier Awards winning once. He also received 26 Grammy Awards nominations, winning 11 awards. For his work in television he has earned two Emmy Awards.

Major awards

Academy Awards

British Academy Film Awards

Critics' Choice Movie Awards

Emmy Awards

Golden Globe Awards

Grammy Awards

Laurence Olivier Awards

Tony Awards

Miscellaenous awards

Annie Awards

BMI Film & TV Awards

Drama Desk Awards

Drama League Awards

Evening Standard Theatre Awards

French Mickey d'Or

Georgia Film Critics Association Awards

Gold Derby Awards

Golden Raspberry Awards

 Menken officially accepted this Razzie and has spoken proudly of it in interviews since.

Hawaii Film Critics Society Awards

Hollywood Film Awards

Hollywood Music in Media Awards

Houston Film Critics Society Awards

International Film Music Critics Association Awards

Las Vegas Film Critics Society Awards

Latino Entertainment Journalists Association Film Awards

New York Drama Critics' Circle Awards

Online Film & Television Association Awards

Outer Critics Circle Awards

Phoenix Film Critics Society Awards

Saturn Awards

Society of Composers & Lyricists

St. Louis Gateway Film Critics Association Awards

Webby Awards

World Soundtrack Awards

Special honors

Disney Legends Awards

Hollywood Walk of Fame

Songwriters Hall of Fame

 1993 – Distinguished Alumni Award (given by New York University Association)
 1998 – Kol Zimrah Award (given by Hebrew Union College-Jewish Institute of Religion)
 1998 – Colleen Dewhurst Awards: "in recognition for outstanding contribution to the arts" (given by Northern Westchester Center for the Arts)
 2000 – Presidential Medal (given by New York University)
 2008 – Inductee: NYU Musical Theatre Hall of Fame
 2009 – Lifetime Achievement Award (given during the Musical Awards)
 2011 – Maestro Award (given by Billboard/The Hollywood Reporter Film and TV Conference)
 2012 – Honors: "for extraordinary life achievement" (given by Encompass New Opera Theatre)
 2013 – The Oscar Hammerstein Award (given by York Theatre Company)
 2013 – Broadway Junior Honors: "in recognition for his contribution towards the advancement of musical theatre for young people"
 2013 – Freddie G. Award for Musical Achievement (given during Junior Theatre Festival)

Notes

References

Awards
Menken, Alan